The 2010 ITF Women's Circuit was the 2010 edition of the second-tier tour for women's professional tennis. It was organised by the International Tennis Federation and was a tier below the WTA Tour. The ITF Women's Circuit included tournaments with prize money ranging from $10,000 up to $100,000. The list of tournaments is split into January–March, April–June, July–September and October–December due to the number of tournaments.

Schedule

January–March

April–June

July–September

October–December

Statistical Information

Key

Titles won by player

Titles won by nation

Retired players

Ranking Distribution 
"+H" indicates that Hospitality is provided.

See also 
 2010 WTA Tour
 2010 ATP World Tour
 2010 ATP Challenger Tour
 Women's Tennis Association
 International Tennis Federation

References

External links 
 International Tennis Federation (ITF) official website

 
ITF Women's Circuit
ITF Women's World Tennis Tour
2010 in women's tennis